Tadeusz Rudolf (22 January 1926 Bochnia— 25 August 2018 Warsaw) was a Polish economist and politician, who served as Minister of Labor and Social Policy from 21 November 1974 to 8 February 1979.

References

1926 births
2018 deaths
Polish politicians
Government ministers of Poland
People from Bochnia